The Warehouse Theatre, located in Hope Street, Weymouth, Dorset, England, has been home to the Weymouth Drama Club since 1993. The Drama Club owns and runs the property, which is primarily used for rehearsing forthcoming productions, although also includes:

A workshop for building theatre sets
An extensive costume and props store
A conference meeting room
Lighting and sound facilities
A kitchen

History
The Warehouse Theatre started out in the c.1930s being the main coal storage for the local Devenish Brewery, located in Hope Square, Weymouth.

When the brewery stopped mass-brewing in 1990 the building was redundant until the Weymouth Drama Club came along in 1993. After a good cleaning effort, the space was made available for rehearsal and now holds an extensive costume store that is available for hire to the public, as well as a props store, workshop and lighting and sound facilities.

The building is available for hire to local customers, but is primarily used for rehearsing forthcoming Drama Club productions. Although the organization is an Amateur Dramatic one, many professionals lend their advice and skills. There are also several social events that occur during the month

The Club strive to maintain the original character of the building, while maintaining an up-to-date multi-purpose facility. Fundraising events are held at the Warehouse to maintain the upkeep of the space, and also to fund the Drama Club's productions. The club recently completed a campaign to buy new seating for productions. This is mainly due to Friends of the Club.

Past productions (by year)
In 1997, the club decided to start using the Warehouse Theatre for main productions as well as the Weymouth Pavilion.

The following is a list of the productions that have taken place at the Warehouse Theatre:

1997
Pride And Prejudice

1998
Billy Liar
Passion Killers

1999
Victoriana
Stepping Out

2000
Anyone For Breakfast
The Ghost Train

2001
The Weekend
Blithe Spirit

2002
The Business Of Murder
Murder In Play

2003
Unleashed
Herbal Bed

2004
Unoriginal Sin
Wyrd Sisters
Love Begins At 50

2005
The Enquiry

2006
An Inspector Calls

2007
Jeffrey Bernard Is Unwell
Death Becomes Us
Inspector Drake & The Perfeckt Crime

2008
Stones in His Pockets

See also
Weymouth Drama Club
Weymouth Pavilion

External links
Weymouth Drama Club official website

1930s establishments in England
Theatres in Dorset
Buildings and structures in Weymouth, Dorset
Culture in Weymouth, Dorset
Tourist attractions in Weymouth, Dorset